Plok! is a side-scrolling platform game developed by British studio Software Creations and its concepts and characters created and owned by Ste and John Pickford. It was released for the Super Nintendo Entertainment System (SNES) in late 1993 by Tradewest in North America, Nintendo in Europe, and Activision in Japan. Players portray the hood-headed titular protagonist, the king of the island Akrillic who is protecting it from fleas spawned by the Flea Queen, who is under the island's ground, as well as other bosses trying to overthrow Plok's power. His versatility lies in his four separable limbs, which can be used to shoot at targets and enemies, and several power-ups scattered throughout its colorful stages as "presents."

Plok!s history began in the late 1980s as a self-funded coin-op project by the two Pickford brothers named Fleapit; they worked on it while at Zippo Games and programmed it for Rare's 'Razz Board' hardware. It was cancelled in 1990 following the closure of Zippo Games, but was revived as a SNES game developed at Software Creations after the Pickfords were promoted to higher positions, with Ste becoming a art director and John a producer. Software Creations self-funded the game with the Pickfords owning intellectual property rights.

Plok! was positively received by critics, who praised its innovative ideas, variety, presentation, versatile playable character, and level design; however, some expressed skepticism of it being the same cutesy colorful platform title as many others, and the Pickfords attributed its underwhelming sales to market saturation of mascot platformers.

Gameplay 

Plok! has two difficulty modes: "Normal" which features the entire game, and "Child's Play" which omits the harder stages and decreases the speed and hit points of enemies. "Plokontinues" are earned if four P-L-O-K tokens are collected, and a token is garnered if a level is finished without dying; if a Game Over occurs, the player will restart with a score of 0, three lives, and at the place the Plokontinue was received. Saving is limited to two "Permanent Continue Positions" after the completion of the Bobbins Brothers and Rockyfella boss fights which the player can return to even after the game is reset, and there is no password feature.

Plok can launch any of his four limbs (two arms and two legs) at will to damage enemies as projectiles from his arms and feet. While a limb instantly returns to Plok's body if it hits an enemy, it takes longer if it does not collide with anything. Limbs can also fire through certain barriers like rock pillars. The only limitation is that he cannot shoot limbs while somersaulting. In later levels, some puzzles involve having to "sacrifice" one of Plok's limbs to activate scenery-changing targets. Once a limb hits a switch, it is placed on a hanger that is usually next to the target. Some targets also require certain limbs. Once Plok is limbless, he moves by bouncing and becomes harder to control.

Plok's secondary attack takes the form of "Speed Blade," a buzzsaw-like jump that not only gives him increased speed as items but also dispatches enemies at the highest damage possible. Plok can pick up shells, which award extra lives and serve as ammunition for a special amulet received partway through the game. The amulet converts shells into power for Plok's secondary attack. There are also "Magic Fruits" that can heal Plok's health; the more he punches a fruit, the bigger it gets and more health he receives. Less frequent are bigger "Golden Fruits" that increase Plok's energy to its fullest. In some levels, some fruits can either send Plok to a timed bonus stage where he must reach a goal or a strange room where he must collect all the shells to progress. Completing these will have Plok warp to the next level with some of them being able to skip boss fights.

"Presents" temporarily upgrades Plok into a character from his favourite movies, such as "Plocky" which equips him with boxing gloves, "Vigilante Plok" which makes him a flamethrower-equipped character a la the "Ploxterminator," the Deerstalker-wearing "Squire Plok" equipped with a blunderbuss, a gun-slinging "Cowboy Plok" based on westerns, and "Rocket Plok" where is equipped with multiple rocket launchers. Presents in the Fleapit yield high-tech, futuristic vehicles with weapons, such as a unicycle with a water cannon, an "off-road truck" with a rocket launcher, a jetpack with lasers, a motorbike with grenades, a tank, a bomb-dropping helicopter, a flying saucer with plasma cannons, and a pair of spring pogo shoes.

The player encounters several different enemies, such as the aforementioned fleas. For fleas, for the player to complete the level, Plok must destroy every single one of them in every level (with the exceptions of Cotton Island, Legacy Island, and Fleapit), where the last one drops a flag which levitates to its flag pole and allows the player to progress.

Plot
As king, Plok dwells on Akrillic, a large island in the fictional archipelago of Polyesta. Plok wakes up one morning and notices his big square flag on the pole on his house's rooftop has been stolen, and goes out searching for it. He spots the flag on Cotton Island from far away and sails to it to find the flag. Plok mistakes some imposter flags for his own, becoming irritated in the process. Plok encounters the two giant creatures who are responsible for placing the fake flags, the Bobbins Brothers, whom Plok's grandpappy had warned him about, and fights them.

Although successfully defeating the Bobbins Brothers and getting his big square flag back, Plok sails back to Akrillic to find the island has been infested and overtaken by "fleas", two-legged blue insects that hatch from eggs and hop around; Plok learns that the theft of his large flag was simply a decoy to lure him away from Akrillic. Plok travels through Akrillic, defeating every single flea on the surface to reclaim his island. 

Partway through the game, Plok places the big square flag back where it belongs outside his home, and then takes a break as he sits on a foot of the statue of his grandfather, Grandpappy Plok, wishing he had found an amulet to help him deal with the fleas. He takes a nap and has an odd dream of his grandfather's search for an amulet 50 years ago. In the dream, the player plays as Grandpappy Plok as he sails from Akrillic to Legacy Island, and shares the same experience as what his grandson is doing now, traveling through bizarre obstacles, discovering artifacts (including Rockyfella), and dealing with the same Bobbin Brothers as well as their third brother Irving. Having defeated them, Grandpappy finally dug up an amulet and sailed back to Akrillic victoriously. Back to the present day, Plok wakes up and discovers that the amulet is located at the bottom of the statue. Plok's mission on getting his island back continues, now with the ability to "charge" a buzzsaw jump ability by sacrificing the shells he has collected.

Plok then heads into various locations around the island while facing other creatures trying to overthrow Akrillic: Penkinos, a group of inflatable, floating magicians of mysterious origin living in the North of the island; Womack, a spider living in the island's center with its long legs being weak points; and Rockyfella, the spirit of the island's soil residing under in the mountains of the island's southeast who is vengeful against Plok for the flagpoles he dug in the ground. After clearing out all the enemies on the island, Plok journeys into the source of the fleas, the Fleapit, where he uses various weapon vehicles. He faces off with the leader of the fleas who hatched them, the Flea Queen, using a high-tech "secret Super-Vehicle" armed with bug spray to defeat her. After the showdown, he returns home to sleep on his green chair.

Development

1988: Rare hires Zippo Games 

In the summer of 1988, Ste and John Pickford, workers at Zippo Games which was owned by John and their friend Steve Hughes, were struggling to complete games for 16-bit Atari ST and Amiga computers, many getting canceled. They learned Rare was looking for developers of Nintendo Entertainment System (NES) titles, which the console had yet to gain steam in the United Kingdom; despite finding the 8-bit system "horribly overpriced and terribly underpowered", the Pickfords took the offer due to financial necessity and their love of the works of Rare founders Tim and Chris Stamper's previous company Ultimate Play the Game. Zippo Games was the only company to have been consulted by Rare for NES work. Despite initial skepticism against the NES, the Pickfords' experience working on Ironsword, as well as playing Mario and Zelda games on the console as required by the Stamper brothers, gained them an appreciation for the console and changed their development focus from being on technical finesse to the player's experience, which is what they had for Plok!.

1988–1989: Fleapit 

John, while Ste was drawing the shop screen for Ironsword, came up with an idea of a character with a hangman's hood; Ste doodled it in a small margin of the layout. The detachable limbs were also conceived in the sketch, as below the character was an arrow pointing to a pile of his parts. John then thought of a game where the player had to capture all jumping fleas in a land, which the two decided to have the hangman be the playable character. Plok's name was then spontaneously coined when John was placing letters from a cassette tape cover on his computer mouse; his full name was "Plok the Exploding Man" to describe his separable design. After more motivation from John, Ste moved to clear sheets of paper to do more sketches, where the character's colors, poses, size (32x40) and "extreme expressions" involving an opening mouth were conceived. 
 
After the formation of these ideas, Chris Stamper went to Zippo Games to introduce a coin-op hardware he designed named the Razz Board. In addition to being impressed by the hardware's innovative graphics system, the Pickfords also saw an opportunity to make a "real arcade game" like the ones in their youth; they previously worked on an Amiga-based coin-op system for World Darts, but never a "real" arcade title. As a result, the Pickfords made a deal with Rare to use the hardware to produce their dream game as well as to own the game property and receive a big chunk of revenue from board sales; however, the deal also made all of the funding up to the brothers. The project was named Fleapit.

Ste vaguely recalled Fleapit in a 2014 interview, comparing its gameplay to Excitebots: Trick Racing (2009) in that the player had to catch one of several flying footballs to score a touchdown in the middle of a level; he reported the product being only a little more "primitive" than Plok!, featuring stages only scrolling horizontal and vertically, more "set pieces or one-off levels," backgrounds made of food like sausages and doughnuts, and a space level. 

As development went on, Rare was profiting mostly from selling NES titles, making them less focused on Razz Board games such as Fleapit. In 1989, Rare, the first company outside of Japan to have a Game Boy, instructed Zippo Games to develop a game for the handheld console; however, this meant stopping the development of Fleapit. Rare and Zippo Games' relationship worsened; Zippo never completed a Game Boy product as instructed and was bought out by Rare in 1990 to be renamed Rare Manchester, which was shut down. Fleapit was cancelled half-completed in 1990 as a result of Zippo Games closing and funds running out; Ste admitted in 2014 a desire to produce a coin-op caused improper business decisions, such as rejecting more financially-rewarding console work.

Late in Fleapits development, the brothers obtained comedian Chris Sievey to voice Plok, contacting him in 1990 via the number on the name of one of his songs, "969 1909." He encountered Sievey in his Franke Sidebottom costume at The Ritz venue, and offered to work for free; however, a short time later, Fleapit was cancelled, and Sievey never voiced the character.

1990–1993: From Zippo to Software Creations 

After leaving Zippo, John phoned Richard Hay, the head of Software Creations, the first company outside of Japan to have a development kit for the Super Nintendo Entertainment System (SNES). Hay hired the Pickfords right away to use it to design and program Equinox (1993), a sequel to the NES title Solstice (1990). The Pickfords were eventually promoted to higher positions, with Ste becoming an art director and John a producer. 

On the side, the Pickfords continued working on Fleapit, coming up with new characters and locations as well as doing more pitch illustrations. Near the completion of Equinox, the Pickfords showcased Fleapit to Hay, pitching it under a new name: Plok! While the brothers and Hay considered many consoles, such as the NES, Super NES, and Game Boy, only a Super NES title came into fruition. Development once again involved self-funding, albeit on the part of Software Creations instead of just the Pickfords. 

Plok!s team consisted of the two brothers as producers, art directors, and designers; John Buckley as programmer; Lyndon Brooke as graphic artist; another set of brothers, Tim and Geoff Follin, developing the music and sound; Kevin Edwards and Stephen Ruddy as compressors; Dan Whitworth creating additional graphics; and an 18-year-old Chun Wah Kong joining in spring 1993 as a tester. Software Creations, for some of their games, hired animators recently laid-off from a Manchester studio, and Whitworth was no exception; he animated the title screen (where Plok plays a harmonica to the theme song) while Ste was on a two-week holiday, and Whitworth's work was enthusiastically-received by the staff. 

Plok! was the Pickford brothers' first experience as project managers, as well as the first time they collaborated with other developers to turn their ideas into a finished product. Buckley later admitted to Plok! being his most "proud" work. and Kong admittined that his experience as the game's tester prepared him for being lead designer on Team Soho's PlayStation 2 title The Getaway (2002): "QA is great grounding for designers. It makes you think critically about how players approach your level; how to reward curiosity if the player wanders off the beaten track; how different approaches could break the game."

Although Pickfords allowed Buckley and Brooke to offer many contributions, development was not without conflict, the biggest argument occurring late in development regarding difficulty; while Buckley and Brooks felt it was proper, the Pickfords found it overbearing. To settle the dispute, the first eight stages which were originally for Cotton Island were moved later as the Grandpappy Plok dream stages, with eight new easier Cotton Island stages created. According to Buckley, dream levels were conceived to vary the pacing, particularly with the Amulet. Kong also reported one of the publishers wanted the first level's difficulty decreased, so the staff decreased the bouncing sprouts' hit points from two to one; however, in the tutorial segment of the final game, the sprouts take two hits as Plok fires an extra arm. While Software Creations did have collectible continues (named "Plokontinues") for Plok!, it did not produce a save battery due to being too costly, and passwords were scrapped out of fear gaming magazines would spread them around.

Kong recalled most of the game was completed close to the end of Equinoxs testing.

Graphics and art 

Many of Plok!s visuals were formulated during its Fleapit stage, where it was being programmed for the Razz Board. The hardware had an unusual system that executed higher-depth graphics and performed better with fewer data. Unlike other hardwares that used bitmap grids that encode colors and transparency through binary numbers, the Razz Board hardware stored pixels as bytes, with the first six bits determining color, the seventh bit setting its vertical position relative to its predecessor, and the eighth its horizontal. For instance, using a bitmap system to create a 32-pixel line requires a grid of 1,024 pixels (32x32) with 992 of them transparent, while making the same line took only 32 bytes in Razz Board. This meant sprites weren't restrained to perfectly square sizes, which Ste took advantage of when creating the text font although setting an arbitrary limit of 22x29. For the SNES game, Brooke designed two new fonts for 16x16 and 8x8 bitmap grids: one based on Ste's font for Fleapit, in turn based on his lettering in concept drawings, and another for the silent movie-esque screens in the Legacy Island levels. Software Creations' leader and Plok! executive producer Mike Webb reported compressing 50% on the game's 16-megabit graphics data (equivalent to Street Fighter II) to eight megabits.

Fleapit was the Pickfords' first game where Ste created concept art, to be more professional and adapt to an increase in presentation to buyers in the industry; according to Ste, this changed the process of green-lighting a game just by starting programming: "Everyone in the industry was self taught, and there were no standards or expectations of how a new game should progress. I remember it being a struggle to justify spending work time drawing pretty pictures which wouldn't actually contribute to the game." Ste added shades to the concept art using Letratone as an easy method to a businesslike aesthetic. Ste drew the illustrations in black and white, due to being focused more on shape than on color and photocopying technology only allowing monochrome prints. The color scheme was formulated originally for an 8-bit arcade title; to achieve a "natural" look, colors were scrunched into extreme areas of the RGB color wheel. When the project turned into a 16-bit SNES game, the color scheme (although generally the same) was more detailed with a wider palette, and Ste used magic markers to color concept art; it was used not only for the game but also for other titles and products of a potential franchise and as illustrations for the instruction manual. 

John's first plan for taking the most advantage of the Razz Board was with how Plok was animated; since he had separable limbs, all of his six parts were independently-moving static sprites. 
The separated limbs of Plok made him easy to animate and took less graphical data, as static parts could be coded to move and rotate instead of creating multiple frames. Ste also had Plok's boots and gloves be gigantic in order for his detachable-limb design to work to its full potential. The fleas, although animated traditionally with frames, were only two legs to make animating extreme poses simpler and for the sprite to not be too busy. Ste reported "5 or 6" frames for all of the fleas' movements. For the SNES console, Brooke altered the design of Plok and the fleas only slightly, but Plok's animation method was transformed; the SNES has the traditional bitmap method of executing pixels, thus he was animated frame-by-frame by Brooke.

Concepts and design 
Fleapit characters not in Plok! include Armstrong, a "mini-version" of Rockyfella; and Suki, a manga-style character who ran an item shop. The Bobbins Brothers and Womack were transferred from Fleapit (although Womack went through a massive redesign by Brooke that Ste appreciated) while the Penkinos were originally-conceived for Plok!. 

The "floating" limb movements were coded in John's first prototype of Fleapit, with the idea of removing limbs incorporated later on as the Pickfords experimented. The idea of costume and vehicle power-up had also been around since Fleapit, although the set of power-ups changed with only the helicopter carrying over; Fleapit-only power-ups included "Robo Plok," a robot form that improved maneuverability and was inspired by Ro-Jaws from the 2000 AD comics; "Ninja Plok" which armed him with an endless amount of throwing stars; and "Super Plok," a superhero with flying abilities. Plok also had the "smart bomb," an ability where he enraged himself to the point of exploding and wiping out all enemies on the screen (as well as his own limbs). 

By the start of the development of the SNES game, Buckley didn't have Fleapits code; thus, he started programming out of what he saw in the VHS footage, including Plok attacking fleas with his limbs and skid-ing down slanted platforms. Brooke conceived triggering parts of the scenery with limbs, reasoning they "looked a bit rough" when constantly looping; however, carrying it out was difficult due to affecting the collision detection and causing Plok's movements to be jolty. He came up with the limb-holding coat hangers two weeks later. The vehicles were left for the final stages, as incorporating them into earlier levels would've taken too much work to "balance" them with those stages' other aspects.

Audio 

When it came to NES and SNES titles, Software Creations was notable for pushing the limits of a hardware's sound, including with Plok! Work on Plok!s soundtrack, composed by Tim and Geoff Follin, began halfway into development. It was categorized by Nintendo World Report as typical of other kid-friendly platform games, although "a bit manic, deceptively bombastic, and diverse in tone". Ste reported Geoff doing around 75% of the work and being far more open for discussion with the team, and Tim being more "elusive". 

Plok! continues the Follin brothers' incorporation of old rock music influences; "Beach," for instance, was inspired by the works of Stevie Wonder, and its guitar solo being influenced by Queen guitarist Brian May. Tim Follin composed the title song out of a guitar-played two-chord progression of "Tequila" by rock and roll group The Champs, as two guitar chord samples could fit within memory. "Lead" instruments such as an electric guitar and harmonicas were made out of simple waveforms, with the guitar's wave identical to a square. A breathing sample in the boss theme was also used in Equinox and Spider-Man and the X-Men in Arcade's Revenge (1992). 

The soundtrack has been released to physical formats twice, on July 27, 2019, to cassette by CANVAS Ltd. and as a limited-edition 500-copy double vinyl on Record Store Day (18 April) 2020 by Respawn Records; Respawned's release had notes and artwork by the Pickfords and both 180gram vinyls colored red and yellow. Rare composer David Wise has expressed admiration for Plok!, claiming his work on Donkey Kong Country to be inspired by the Follin brothers' soundtrack.

Release

Publishing 

Software Creations was so confident in Plok! the developer tried to persuade Nintendo to publish it; reception from the corporation's Japan and American branches was positive. Shigeru Miyamoto expressed a strong interest in working on the game; when Plok! was only half-finished, he wrote a letter to Hay claiming it was the third-best platform game below Sonic and Mario and that he would make it the second-greatest in the genre above Sonic but below Mario. Tony Harman, product acquisitions and development manager at Nintendo of America, also attended the studio to play Plok! four weeks within its development, and told Kay Miyamoto was amazed by the game's audio to the point of analyzing it. For unknown reasons, however, Nintendo only published Plok! in Europe, while Tradewest published it in North America and Activision in Japan. Although reasons for Nintendo's rejection haven't been disclosed, Ste inductively reasoned Miyamoto found it too similar to a Super Mario World sequel in development, particularly with its mini-race levels.

Promotion 
The Pickfords, despite owning the IP and developing Plok!, were never consulted on promotion. Tradewest set Plok!s primary demographic at gamers six-to-fourteen years old. Although published by Tradewest in the United States, Plok! still received promotion from Nintendo of America; a complete guide and review was published in the October 1993 issue of its magazine Nintendo Power, and a two-page section in a Nintendo Player's Guide book for Mario Paint (1993) included templates of body part stamps to animate Plok and the flea enemies, and a background painting based on one of the Cotton Island levels. In the United Kingdom, Nintendo released a VHS tape, Super Mario All-Stars Video (1993); hosted by Craig Charles, the video features a segment of testers at Nintendo UK promoting upcoming games, including Plok! Club Nintendo, Germany's official Nintendo magazine, ran a comic strip where Plok races with Mario at an Olympic match in space.

Some print advertising was criticized in later years by Ste for not showing enough of the game itself. Tradewest's US print advertisement depicted the top half taken up by Double Dragon and Battletoads, the bottom half a picture of the Plok character; the only info revealed was that Plok! was published by the two other franchises. Nintendo's UK print ad depicted a faux desktop screenshot with an image of an angry old lady in the house as the wallpaper; the only Plok! visual depicted was its box art, placed in the bottom right and very small-sized.

However, other print advertisements were much more true to the game, such as Tradewest's series of comic book panel ads named The Adventures of Plok with Plok's origins at the storyline.

Plok! was first announced in June 1993; upon its announcement, an N-Force journalist called it one of the most "surreal" games in the September 1993 line-up. Tradewest presented Plok! at the summer 1993 Consumer Electronics Show; a GameFan writer called Tradewest "one of the [show's] most impressive third party line-up," highlighting Plok! as a "a colorful new action title with a lead character that hurls his arms and legs at attackers."

Reception

Contemporaneous reviews 

Upon release, some critics declared Plok! the best Nintendo release of 1993 as well as another classic by the company, the best platform game of the year, and one of the all-time best in the genre. However, Plok! was compared to many other games of its kind, and even the most favorable reviewers expressed skepticism about playing another average colorful cutesy platform game. Some critics ultimately thought it was and criticized its lack of depth. A frequent comparison was with Sonic the Hedgehog (1991), particularly in its "sugary" tone and Plok's speed ball attack; GameStars FI derogatorily labeled the titular character as "a puny version" of the Sega franchise's blue hedgehog, criticizing his weird design and calling it names such as "hot pink reddy coloured duck penguin thing" and "freaky pork chop."

However, other reviewers opined Plok as distinguished in the genre, noting innovative aspects such as the costume and weapon power-ups and limb mechanics. Reviews also enjoyed its humor, such as with Plok's limbless movements, his power-ups, and nonsensical story; Humphreys felt it would help the game be enjoyed by even the biggest detractors of kid-friendly platformers. The hero was applauded for being charming, more lovable than other mascots of its kind, and versatile, particularly with his limbs and his costume and weapon power-ups. Trenton Webb found the limb mechanic "quite fun to mess around with uselessly," and an Electronic Gaming Monthly critic called it "catchy" with "plenty of situations to test it." Superjuegos writer The Elf called his vehicle power-ups "fantastic and fun," and Hyper magazine Jason Humphreys claimed the cowboy power-up his favourite.

Some critics were addicted to Plok!s gameplay and eulogized its playability, perfect control, and variety. Super Plays Jonathan Davies felt it kept adding new concepts as the game went on, and praised some of them, such as patterns of item placements directing the player to off-camera platforms and bouncing off water instead of drowning to death. Plok!s difficulty was also highlighted, mostly attributed to lack of a password system, save feature, and requirement for continues to be earned. Other contributors to the challenge included long stage lengths and sudden obstacles such as rolling logs. One Total! journalist reported being confused what action to do next in some stages, and another from HobbyConsolas disclosed getting lost in levels and unable to look for targets and fleas required to complete levels. While some reviewers approved how hard Plok was, others disliked not being able to save or use passwords, reasoning it was annoying to replay earlier stages over and over again.

The cartoony graphics were praised as colorful, surreal, adorable, and featuring "vivid backgrounds"; one reviewer called them some of the best on the Super Nintendo, while another compared it to Equinox. FI appreciated the detail, such as Plok's breathing animation when standing still and the many "little coloured flowers everywhere, looking like real flower power stuff." The music was highlighted (by one critic as the game's best aspect) and noted for pushing the hardware limitations, and sound effects were praised.

Commercial performance and plans for a franchise 
John Pickford and Kay had faith in Plok! being commercially successful. The Pickford brothers garnered IP ownership for the Plok character, common in other media economies but rare in the video games industry; and planned a franchise out of it, such as sequels, ports, and merchandise. A Mega Drive version was planned using a Software Creations worker's software for automatically converting SNES titles into Mega Drive games; 80% of the code was automatically converted, according to Ste, with the other 20% requiring hands-on work. Ultimately, however, despite Webb announcing the port's completion in an April 1994 interview, it was never released for unknown reasons.

Ste, using magic markers, created artwork for future sequels and merchandise, such as style guides of the characters and illustrations of scenes. The Pickfords planned sequels to involve Plok searching for the fleas' home, introduce a setting named Tower Island, and make Plok's comfy chair (which he sleeps on in the end credits of Plok!) a more crucial part of the gameplay. The Pickfords also drew concepts for toys used for pitches of the SNES game, such as a doll where limbs were joined and detached with velcro. During marketing, a Plok model was created in 3D Studio 4 for a promotional photo of Software Creations.

However, 1992, late in Plok!s development, saw the beginning of a saturation of colorful platform games starring cute mascots, like Bubsy and Zool. Ste, in 2004, publicly stated developers and producers with more finances knew about previews of the Fleapit coin-op, which may have influenced them to produce games like it; there are no other reports verifying this. Although selling decently over a long period, none of the revenue went to the Pickfords, and Ste suggested the saturation hindered its commercial performance significantly; this plus Software Creations constantly changing publishers between projects rendered a Plok! franchise impossible for several years.

Legacy 
In 2009, North American company Super Fighter Team released Zaku, a horizontal shooter for the Atari Lynx which features a special guest appearance by Plok. 

The Pickfords later launched a Plok webcomic. From there, the webcomic takes place 20 years after the game as it features new characters and some returning ones like Rockyfella. The comic sometimes used pop-culture references from other games and other media, in-jokes reference and commentaries on the game's development and its future.

In later years, Plok was ranked the 26th all-time best SNES title (which also named it the best platformer produced in the United Kingdom) in 1996, the 19th best platform game by Gamereactor in 2014, and was listed in Edge editor Tony Mott's 1001 Video Games You Must Play Before You Die in its 2013 edition. Video game elements introduced in Plok! were noted by retrospective journalists to be in more popular platformers released in later years. Games starring characters with floating body parts used as weapons, such as Dynamite Headdy (1994) and Rayman (1995), were released shortly afterwards and garnered much wider exposure. When listing Plok! on a list of "The Most Unappreciated Platformers Of The '90s" for Kotaku, Ben Bertoli wrote it was "influential for portraying a world, named Akrill[ic], based on craft supplies and cloth, a concept that Nintendo itself has come to rely on for many games. The game also provided players with power-ups and vehicles, such as flamethrowers and jetpacks, the likes of which had not been seen in a single game." Sepia-toned flashback stages also made up a chunk of Mickey Mania (1994).

Notes

References

Citations

Works cited 

</ref>

External links
The Plok Archive, part of the Pickford Bros.'s official site
Plok at Gamespot.com

1993 video games
Activision games
Cancelled Sega Genesis games
Nintendo games
Platform games
Software Creations games
Super Nintendo Entertainment System games
Super Nintendo Entertainment System-only games
Tradewest games
Video games about insects
Video games developed in the United Kingdom
Video games scored by Tim Follin
Video games set on fictional islands
Single-player video games